Filthy America... It's Beautiful is the third studio album by American hip hop group The Lox. It is their first studio album in 16 years. The album was released on December 16, 2016, by D-Block Records and Roc Nation.

Track listing

Notes
 "Secure the Bag" features additional vocals by DJ Khaled.

Charts

References

2016 albums
The Lox albums
D-Block Records albums
Roc Nation albums
Albums produced by Dame Grease
Albums produced by DJ Premier
Albums produced by Pete Rock